Gogrial, or Qaqriyal, is a town in South Sudan.

Location
Gogrial is located in center of the state, Warrap State, close to the borders with the Republic of Sudan and the Abyei region. The coordinates of Gogrial are: 8° 31' 48.00"N, 28° 6' 0.00"E (Latitude: 8.5300; Longitude: 28.1000).

Overview
Gogrial, like most South Sudanese towns, sits on a riverbank. This town is one of two places where former NBA player Manute Bol was reported to have been born, with some reports saying he was actually born in Turalei, where his remains were buried.

Population
, the exact population of Gogrial is not known.

Points of interest

The points of interest in or near the town of Gogrial include the following:

 The Jur River - The river passes to the east of the town
 Gogrial Airport - A small civilian airport, with a single unpaved runway
 The main road from Wau, South Sudan to Babanusa, Sudan (B38) passes thorough Gogrial in a north to south direction

See also
 Bahr el Ghazal
 Gogrial Airport

References

External links
  Location of Gogrial At Google Maps

Populated places in Warrap (state)
Bahr el Ghazal